Kaliachak Assembly constituency was an assembly constituency in Malda district in the Indian state of West Bengal.

Overview
As a consequence of the orders of the Delimitation Commission, Kaliachak Assembly constituency ceases to exist from 2011. There are two new constituencies in the area – Mothabari Assembly constituency and Baisnabnagar Assembly constituency.

Kaliachak Assembly constituency was part of Malda (Lok Sabha constituency).

Members of Legislative Assembly

For MLAs from the area in subsequent years see Baisnabnagar Assembly constituency and Mothabari Assembly constituency

Election results

1977–2006
In the 2006 state assembly elections, Biswanath Ghosh of CPI(M) won the Kaliachak assembly seat defeating his nearest rival Abu Hasem Khan Choudhury of Congress. Contests in most years were multi cornered but only winners and runners are being mentioned. Abu Hasem Khan Choudhury of Congress defeated Biswanath Ghosh of CPI(M) in 2001 and 1996. Dinesh Joardar of CPI(M) defeated Ahmed Shamsuddin of Congress in 1991 and 1987. Promode Ranjan Bose of CPI(M) defeated Ahmed Shamsuddin of Congress in 1982. Ahmed Shamsuddin of Congress defeated Promode Ranjan Bose of CPI(M) in 1977.

1951–1972
Shamsuddin Ahamed of Congress won in 1972, 1971 and 1969. N. Islam of CPI(M) won in 1967. Promode Ranjan Bose, Independent, won in 1962. Mahibur Rahman Choudhury of Congress won in 1957. In 1951, when independent India’s first election was held, there were two seats in Kaliachak. Abul Barkat Ataul Gani, Independent, won the Kaliachak (North) seat. Sowrindra Mohan Misra of Congress won the Kaliachak (South) seat.

References

Former assembly constituencies of West Bengal
Politics of Malda district
1952 establishments in West Bengal
Constituencies established in 1952
2011 disestablishments in India
Constituencies disestablished in 2011